Minnesota Lightning was an American women’s soccer team, founded in 2006. The team was a member of the United Soccer Leagues W-League, the second tier of women’s soccer in the United States and Canada. The team played in the Midwest Division of the Central Conference. The team folded after the 2009 season.

The team played its home games at the National Sports Center in the city of Blaine, Minnesota, 18 miles north of downtown Minneapolis. The team's colors were navy blue and pale blue.

The team was a sister organization of the men's Minnesota Thunder team, which played in the USL First Division. The Minnesota Thunder was suspended from the USL First Division after they left the USL for the new North American Soccer League.

Year-by-year

Honors
 USL W-League Midwest Division Champions 2007

See also
Minnesota Lynx
Minnesota Whitecaps
Minnesota Vixen

References

External links
 Minnesota Lightning

   

Women's soccer clubs in the United States
Soccer clubs in Minneapolis–Saint Paul
Defunct soccer clubs in Minnesota
Minnesota Thunder
USL W-League (1995–2015) teams
2006 establishments in Minnesota
2009 disestablishments in Minnesota
Association football clubs established in 2006
Association football clubs disestablished in 2009
Women's sports in Minnesota